The 1965 World Table Tennis Championships were held in Hala Tivoli, Ljubljana, SR Slovenia, SFR Yugoslavia from April 15 to April 25, 1965.

Medalists

Team

Individual

References

External links
ITTF Museum

 
World Table Tennis Championships
World Table Tennis Championships
World Table Tennis Championships
Table tennis competitions in Yugoslavia
International sports competitions hosted by Yugoslavia
Sports competitions in Ljubljana
World Table Tennis Championships
1960s in Ljubljana
World Table Tennis Championships